The football tournament at the 1985 Brunei Merdeka Games was held from June 24 to 31 in Bandar Seri Begawan, Brunei.

Teams 
The standard of the teams is not clear. Brunei and Philippines were probably the full national teams. Singapore is unlikely to have been the national team. Malaysia, Indonesia, and Thailand were definitely not (their full national teams were playing in World Cup qualifiers during this period). Indonesia was represented by a selection from the Perserikatan league.

Group stage

Group A

Group B

Knockout stage

Semi-finals

Bronze medal match 
Bronze medal match unknown (if any).

Gold medal match

References 
Morrison, Neil. "Brunei Merdeka Games 1985". RSSSF.

Brunei
1985
Foo
1985 in Singaporean sport
1985 in Malaysian sport
1985 in Thai sport